Robert Matney (born 1976) in Dallas, Texas, is VP of Strategic Partnerships at Yonder at Yonder (company). He has worked as a social media analyst and practitioner, web developer, actor (stage, voice), theater director, and currently living in Austin, Texas. Matney is co-producing artistic director of Breaking String Theater and the technology designer at the Hidden Room Theatre . He has spoken at SXSW  every year since 2011 with the Hidden Room and Look Left Look Right  about their work on Skype theatre and linking actors and audience using technology. Matney graduated from The University of Texas in 1998 with a degree in philosophy and having studied Shakespeare-in-Performance at the Shakespeare at Winedale program.

Career

Technology Designer
Matney was the Hidden Room Theatre's technology designer for "You Wouldn't Know Her, She Lives in London / You Wouldn't Know Him, He Lives in Texas." Jo Caird from London's What's On Stage said the show should be "applauded for their attempt to explore this new territory," and that "theatre has only to gain from this type of innovation." Matney designed the technology that linked theatres from Austin and Moscow for the New Russian Drama Festival via video teleconferencing technology. He spoke about his efforts to join theatres through this method at SXSW Interactive in 2011. Matney spoke in 2011 on innovations in this field at the Hybrid Arts Summit for the Fusebox Festival in Austin Texas.

Theatre/Film/Television

Anime
 Birth (anime) (OAV) as Inorganic Biker #1
 Magical Play (ONA)
 Petite Princess Yucie (TV) as Gunbard
 Getbackers

Video Games
 DC Universe Online as Doctor Psycho

Stage Roles
 A Most Unsettling and Possibly Haunted Evening In the Parlour of the Brothers Grimm as Wilhelm Grimm, The Hidden Room Theatre, October 2010

Web Development
Matney joined Polycot Associates as web project manager in 2011, managing the development of websites and web applications. He worked with the rest of the team on the company's conversion to a worker-owned and -managed cooperative. Matney also took responsibility for business development, which included participation with an Austin chapter of BNI (organization). He spent seven years with Polycot Associates before he joined Yonder (company).

Government Affairs
Matney has worked for Yonder (company) since November 2018, and is currently Managing Director of Public Affairs. The company was originally called New Knowledge, and was known for its role in developing the authoritative report on Russian influence operations targeting US elections from 2015 forward for the Senate Select Committee on Intelligence (SSCI). The report leveraged data from Alphabet (Google), Twitter, and Facebook. In his role at Yonder, Matney has become a thought leader  in disinformation analysis, online authenticity, and the influence mechanics of the internet.

References

External links

American male voice actors
American male stage actors
University of Texas at Austin College of Liberal Arts alumni
Living people
1976 births